The 2018 Papua gubernatorial election took place in Papua, Indonesia on 27 June 2018 as part of the simultaneous local elections. It was held to elect the governor of Papua along with their deputy, whilst members of the provincial council (Dewan Perwakilan Rakyat Daerah) will be re-elected in 2019.

Incumbent Lukas Enembe ran for his second term against the regent of Jayawijaya Regency John Wempi Wetipo.

Timeline
Registration for party-backed candidates were opened between 8 and 10 January 2018, while independent candidates were required to register between 22 and 26 November 2017 although none registered. The candidates were assigned their ballot numbers on 21 February 2018. The campaigning period would commence between 15 February and 24 June, with a three-day election silence before voting on 27 June.

The General Elections Commission planned to release a list of eligible voters by 22 April 2018, but it was delayed citing delays from several regions. A placeholder count from March 2018 placed the voter count at 3,125,047.

Candidates
As per regulations due to the province's special autonomy status, candidates are required to garner the support of political parties totaling 15 percent of the popular vote in the 2014 election or parties controlling 15 percent of the 55-seat provincial council. 

The Lukas-Klemen pair (abbreviated as Lukmen) are both incumbents. After garnering the support of most political parties in 2017, several media outlets and his party Demokrat speculated that the election will be uncontested. On January 4, however, PDI-P leader Megawati Sukarnoputri declared that the party will place its support behind John Wempi Wetipo, regent of Jayawijaya Regency with former regent of Jayapura Regency Habel Melkias Suwae as his running mate. The John-Suwae ticket (abbreviated as Josua) also received the endorsement of Gerindra, despite the two parties being the main parties of the government (Koalisi Indonesia Hebat) and opposition (Koalisi Merah Putih) coalitions in the People's Representative Council. Deputy speaker of the parliament and Gerindra vice-chairman Fadli Zon noted that the alliance was "reflecting the aspirations of local areas".

Results

References

Papua (province)
2018 Indonesian gubernatorial elections